The 1999 IIHF Women's World Championships was held between March 8–14, 1999, in the city of Espoo in Finland.  Team Canada won their fifth consecutive gold medal at the World Championships defeating the United States. Canada skated to a solid 3–1 victory in the final to take the gold with a solid performance that saw them winning all five games.

Finland picked up their fifth consecutive bronze medal, with a win over Sweden who had their strongest performance since 1992.

Qualification

The 1999 tournament created the format that has remained to the present, as the World Championships was greatly expanded to incorporate the European Championships and the Pacific Qualification Tournaments.  There were a series of Qualification Tournaments Held to assign teams places in this first year, with the standard Promotion and Relegation model following after that.  The top five nations from the Nagano Olympics were joined by three qualifiers.

Top five at the Olympics:

Qualifiers from world tournaments:
 - Final Qualification group A winner
 - Final Qualification group B winner
 - Won playoff against  for final spot

World Championship Group A

The eight participating teams were divided up into two seeded groups as below. The teams played each other once in a single round robin format. The top two teams from the group proceeded to the Final Round, while the remaining teams played in the consolation round.

First round

Group A

Standings

Results
All times local

Group B

Standings

Results
All times local

Playoff round

Consolation round 5–8 place

Consolation round 7–8 place

Consolation round 5–6 place

Final round

Semifinals

Match for third place

Final

Champions

Scoring leaders

Goaltending leaders

Final standings

World Championship Group B

In addition to the main World Championships, this year saw the first running of World Championship Group B, which replaced the European Championships. Eight further teams played in this competition, hosted by France in the town of Colmar.  won the tournament defeating  in the final 7-1 to win the competition and to ensure their Promotion to the main World Championship in 2000.

Directorate Awards
Goalie: Sami Jo Small, (Canada)
Defender: Kirsi Hanninen, (Finland)
Forward: Jenny Schmidgall, (United States)

References

External links
 Summary from the Women's Hockey Net
 Detailed summary from passionhockey.com

 
World
IIHF Women's World Ice Hockey Championships
1999
World
March 1999 sports events in Europe
Women's ice hockey competitions in Finland
Sport in Espoo
1999 in Finnish women's sport
Sport in Vantaa